[[File:Ulvophyceae_composite.jpg|thumb|Composite image illustrating the diversity of Ulvophyceae. Top left: Ulva. Top right: Caulerpa. Bottom left: Bornetella. Bottom right: Dictyosphaeria.]]The Ulvophyceae or ulvophytes are a class of green algae, distinguished mainly on the basis of ultrastructural morphology, life cycle and molecular phylogenetic data. The ulvophytes are diverse in their morphology and their habitat. Most are seaweeds, although a select few live in fresh water.

This list of Ulvophyceae genera is sub-divided by order and family. Some genera have uncertain taxonomic placement and are listed as incertae sedis. The list is based on the data available in AlgaeBase, the Integrated Taxonomic Information System (ITIS), the National Center for Biotechnology Information taxonomic database (NCBI), and other taxonomic databases.

 Order Bryopsidales 

 Family Bryopsidaceae
 Bryopsidella Bryopsis Jaffrezocodium Lambia Pseudobryopsis Pseudoderbesia Trichosolen Family Caulerpaceae
 Ahnfeldtia Caulerpa Caulerpella Corradoria Herpochaeta Himandactylius Stephanocoelium Tricladia Family Chaetosiphonaceae
 Chaetosiphon Family Codiaceae
 † Abacella Agardhia Appeninocodium Arabicodium Botryella Codium Geppella Johnsonicodium Lamarckia Moniliaxes Neoanchicodium Spongodium Family Derbesiaceae
 Derbesia Pedobesia Pedodiscus Family Dichotomosiphonaceae
 Avrainvillea Cladocephalus Dichotomosiphon Family Halimedaceae
 Halimeda Family Ostreobiaceae
 Ostreobium Family Pseudocodiaceae
 Pseudocodium Family Pseudoudoteaceae
 Hydraea Pseudoudotea Family RhipiliaceaeRhipiliaRhipiliopsisSiphonoclathrus Family Udoteaceae
 Boodleopsis Botryodesmis Callipsygma Chlorodesmis Chloroplegma Coralliodendron Flabellia Penicillus Poropsis Pseudochlorodesmis Pseudopenicillus Rhipidosiphon Rhipiliella Rhipocephalus Siphonogramen Tydemania Udotea Order Chlorocystidales 
 Family Chlorocystidaceae
 Desmochloris Order Cladophorales 

 Family Anadyomenaceae
 Anadyomene Microdictyon Family Boodleaceae
 Boodlea Cladophoropsis Nereodictyon Phyllodictyon Struvea Struveopsis Family Cladophoraceae
 Bryobesia Chaetomorpha Cladophora Lurbica Lychaete Pseudorhizoclonium Rhizoclonium Spongiochrysis Willeella Family Okellyaceae
 Okellya Family PithophoraceaeAegagropilaAegagropilopsisArnoldiellaBasicladiaChaetocladiellaChaetonellaCladogoniumCladostromaDermatophytonGemmiphoraPithophoraWittrockiella Family PseudocladophoraceaePseudocladophora Family Siphonocladaceae
 Apjohnia Boergesenia Chamaedoris Dictyosphaeria Ernodesmis Siphonocladus Family Valoniaceae
 Petrosiphon Valonia Valoniopsis Order Dasycladales 

 Family Dasycladaceae
 †Acicularia †Acroporella Amicus Anatolipora Andrusoporella Anfractuosoporella †Anisoporella †Anthracoporella †Archaeocladus †Atractyliopsis Batophora †Beresella Bornetella †Chinianella Chloroclados †Clavapora †Clavaporella Connexia Cylindroporella Cymopolia Dasycladus Dissocladella †Dvinella †Endoina †Eoclypeina Eogoniolina †Eovelebitella †Epimastopora †Euteutloporella †Favoporella †Fourcadella †Genotella †Goniolinopsis †Gyroporella Halicoryne Holosporella †Imperiella †Kantia †Kochanskyella †Lacrymorphus †Macroporella †Mizzia †Munieria †Nanjinoporella Neomeris †Oligoporella †Ollaria †Pentaporella †Permopora †Placklesia †Salpingoporella †Teutloporella †Thailandoporella †Uragiella †Uragiellopsis †Uraloporella †Velomorpha †Vermiporella †Xainzanella †Zaporella Family Polyphysaceae
 Acetabularia Chalmasia Clypeina Ioanella Parvocaulis Pseudoclypeina Family Triploporellaceae
 Deloffrella Draconisella Triploporella Order Ignatiales 
 Family Ignatiaceae
 Ignatius Pseudocharacium Order Oltmannsiellopsidales 
 Family Oltmannsiellopsidaceae
 Halochlorococcum Neodangemannia Oltmannsiellopsis Order Scotinosphaerales 
 Family Scotinosphaeraceae
 Kentrosphaera Scotinosphaera Order Sykidiales 
 Family SykidiacaeaeSykidion Order Trentepohliales 
 Family Trentepohliaceae
 Cephaleuros Friedaea Lochmium Phycopeltis Physolinum Printzina Rhizothallus Sporocladus Stomatochroon Trentepohlia Order Ulotrichales 

 Family Binucleariaceae Binuclearia Family Collinsiellaceae Collinsiellopsis Family Gayraliaceae Gayralia Family Gloeotilaceae Coccothrix Family Gomontiaceae Chlorojackia Collinsiella Eugomontia 
 Gomontia Family Hazeniaceae Chamaetrichon 
 Hazenia Family Helicodictyaceae Protoderma Rhexinema Family Kraftionemaceae Kraftionema Family Monostromataceae Monostroma Family Planophilaceae Chloroplana Fernandinella Planophila 
 Pseudendocloniopsis Tetraciella Family Sarcinofilaceae Filoprotococcus Sarcinofilum Family Tupiellaceae Tupiella Vischerioclonium Family Ulotrichaceae Acrosiphonia Capsosiphon Chlorhormidium Chlorocystis Chlorothrix Codiolum Dendronema Didymothrix Fottea Geminellopsis Gloeotilopsis Gyoerffyella Heterothrichopsis Hormidiopsis Hormidiospora Hormococcus Ingenhouzella Interfilum Microsporopsis Pearsoniella Protomonostroma Psephonema Psephotaxus Pseudoschizomeris Pseudothrix Spongomorpha Ulothrix Ulotrichopsis UrosporaIncertae sedis Trichosarcina Order Ulvales 

 Family Bolbocoleonaceae 
 Bolbocoleon Family Cloniophoraceae
 Cloniophora Family Ctenocladaceae
 Ctenocladus Pseudopleurococcus Spongioplastidium Family Kornmanniaceae
 Blidingia Dilabifilum Kornmannia Lithotrichon Neostromatella Pseudendoclonium Tellamia Family Phaeophilaceae
 Phaeophila Family Ulvaceae
 Enteronia Gemina Letterstedtia Lobata Ochlochaete Percursaria Ruthnielsenia Solenia Ulva Ulvaria Umbraulva Family Ulvellaceae
 Acrochaete Endoderma Entocladia Entoderma Epicladia Pringsheimiella Pseudopringsheimia Pseudoneochloris Syncoryne Trichothyra Ulvella Incertae sedis Halofilum Paulbroadya Incertae sedis BlastophysaTrichophilus''

References

External links 

 
 
  
 

 *
Ulvophyceae genera
Ulvophyceae
Ulvophyceae